Prov Sadovsky was the stage name of Prov Mikhailovich Yermilov (1818-1872), a Russian actor who founded the famous Sadovsky theatrical family, which was regarded as the foremost interpreters of the plays by Aleksandr Ostrovsky in the Malyi Theatre until the mid-20th century. It has been said that Sadovsky and his relatives made of Ostrovsky's plays a national institution. Additionally, Prov Sadovsky finds mention in ´Anton Chekhov's famous 1896 play, The Seagull, in a comparison to a famous Russian comedian of the same era, Pavel Chadin. Both men were known at the time to play the same character, Rasplyuev, from the comedy, The Marriage of Krechinsky by A. Sukhovo-Kobylin.

Russian male actors
1818 births
1872 deaths
19th-century male actors from the Russian Empire